San Mateo is one of the forty subbarrios of Santurce, San Juan, Puerto Rico.

Demographics
In 2000, San Mateo had a population of 1,989.

In 2010, San Mateo had a population of 1,549 and a population density of 22,128.6 persons per square mile.

Places
The historic Church of San Mateo de Cangrejos of Santurce is in San Mateo, at Calle San Jorge and Calle San Mateo (one block from Avenida Juan Ponce de León).

Gallery

See also
 
 List of communities in Puerto Rico

References

Santurce, San Juan, Puerto Rico
Municipality of San Juan